Ranpur (Sl. No.: 119) is a Vidhan Sabha constituency of Nayagarh district, Odisha.

This constituency includes Ranpur block and 18 Gram panchayats (Gotisahi, Solapata, Bhaliadihi,Magarabandha, Saranakul, Sikharpur, Angisingi, Dimisara, Godipada, Haridabandha,Panchumu, Kajalaipalli, Golagaon,Barasahi, Godipalli, P Manpur, Hariharpur and Badagorada) of Odagaon block.

Elected Members

Fifteen elections were held between 1951 and 2014.
Elected members from the Ranpur constituency are:
2019: (119): Satyanarayana Pradhan (BJD) 
2014: (119): Rabinarayan Mohapatra(BJD) 
2009: (119): Satyanarayan Pradhan (BJD)
2004: (61): Surama Padhy (BJP)
2000: (61): Ramakanta Mishra (Congress)
1995: (61): Ramakanta Mishra (Congress) 
1990: (61): Sarat Chandra Mishra (Janata Dal)
1985: (61): Ramakanta Mishra (Congress)
1980: (61): Ramakanta Mishra (Congress-I)
1977: (61): Ramesh Chandra Panda (CPI (M))
1974: (61): Ramesh Chandra Panda (CPI (M))
1971: (60): Ramesh Chandra Panda (CPI (M))
1967: (60): Raghu Ray (Congress) & Ramchandra Ram (CPI)
1961: (85): Brajenda Chandra Singh (Congress)
1957: (58): Basantamanjari Devi (Congress)
1951: (92): Basantamanjari Devi (Congress)

2019 Election Result

2014 Election Results
In 2014 election, Biju Janata Dal candidate Rabinarayan Mohapatra defeated Bharatiya Janata Party candidate Surama Padhy by a margin of 16,426 votes.

2009 Election Results
In 2009 election, Biju Janata Dal candidate Satyanarayan Pradhan defeated Bharatiya Janata Party candidate Surama Padhy by a margin of 21,601 votes.

Notes

References

Assembly constituencies of Odisha
Nayagarh district